Myoporum parvifolium, commonly known as creeping boobialla, creeping myoporum, dwarf native myrtle or small leaved myoporum is a plant in the figwort family, Scrophulariaceae. It is a low, spreading shrub with long, trailing stems and white, star-shaped flowers and is endemic to southern Australia including Flinders Island.

Description
Creeping boobialla is a prostrate, spreading shrub sometimes forming a mat  in diameter. They are arranged alternately, sometimes have a few serrations on the margins near the leaf tip and sometimes have raised, wart-like tubercles on their surface.

The flowers have five lance-shaped sepals and five petals joined at their bases to form a tube. There are four stamens which extend beyond the petals.

Taxonomy and naming
Myoporum parvifolium was first formally described by botanist Robert Brown in Prodromus Florae Novae Hollandiae in 1810. The specific epithet parvifolium is derived from the Latin parvus, "small" and folium, "leaf".

Distribution and habitat
Myoporum parvifolium occurs in the south-west corner of New South Wales, and from the Eyre Peninsula in South Australia eastwards to Victoria. It is common along much of the Murray River in South Australia. It often grows on limestone cliffs, along river flats and in woodland in sandy sometimes saline soils.

Use in horticulture
Creeping boobialla is a useful ground cover and is often cultivated for that purpose. It prefers a well-drained, sunny position but is hardy in most situations. It is usually propagated from cuttings and has been used as a rootstock for more difficult related species such as Eremophila.

References

parvifolium
Flora of South Australia
Flora of Victoria (Australia)
Lamiales of Australia
Garden plants of Australia
Groundcovers
Plants described in 1810
Taxa named by Robert Brown (botanist, born 1773)